CHAOS is a small (6 MByte) Linux distribution designed for creating ad hoc computer clusters.

About

Description 
CHAOS creates a basic node in an OpenMosix cluster and is typically not deployed on its own; cluster builders will use feature-rich Linux distributions (such as Quantian or ClusterKnoppix) as a "head node" in a cluster to provide their application software, while the CHAOS distribution runs on "drone nodes" to provide "dumb power" to the cluster.

While this deployment model suits the typical cluster builder, OpenMosix is a peer-based cluster, consisting of only one type of node. All OpenMosix nodes are inherently equal and each can be, simultaneously, parent and child.

Operation

Development

Security

See also 

 List of Linux distributions
 Live CD
 List of Live CDs
 OpenMosix

References

External links
 CHAOS homepage at Midnight Code

Light-weight Linux distributions
Operating system distributions bootable from read-only media
Cluster computing
Linux distributions